Neosticta fraseri is a species of damselfly in the family Isostictidae,
commonly known as a tropical pinfly. 
It can be found in tropical north-eastern Queensland, Australia, where it inhabits streams.

Neosticta fraseri is a slender, medium-sized damselfly, dull brown to black in colour with pale markings. Adults have a slight pruinescence

This damselfly is named after F.C. Fraser, the English entomologist who illustrated this species in 1960, when it was then named Neosticta silvarum.

Gallery

See also
 List of Odonata species of Australia

References 

Isostictidae
Odonata of Australia
Insects of Australia
Endemic fauna of Australia
Taxa named by J.A.L. (Tony) Watson
Insects described in 1991
Damselflies